Goochland Cave is the longest known cave in Rockcastle County, Kentucky.  It has a length of 11.18 miles.  Goochland is located in Daniel Boone National Forest and is named on USGS Topo maps.  The cave is subject to flash flooding.  It has 3 known entrances.  Not all of this cave has been mapped.

References

External links
 Large-scale 9.41-mile map of Goochland Cave
 Photo of Goochland Cave

Caves of Kentucky
Landforms of Rockcastle County, Kentucky